Water Street Historic District or Water Street Commercial Historic District may refer to:
Water Street Historic District National Historic Site of Canada, St. John's, Newfoundland and Labrador, Canada
Water Street Historic District (Torrington, Connecticut)
Water Street Historic District (Augusta, Kentucky)
Water Street District, Lock Haven, Pennsylvania
Water Street Historic District (Clifton, Tennessee)
Water Street Historic District (Eau Claire, Wisconsin)
Water Street Commercial Historic District (Shullsburg, Wisconsin)
Water Street Commercial Historic District (Sparta, Wisconsin), a National Register of Historic Places listing in Monroe County, Wisconsin

See also
Broad Street–Water Street Historic District, Lyons, New York
Plankinton-Wells-Water Street Historic District, a National Register of Historic Places listing in Milwaukee, Wisconsin
St. Paul-North Water Streets Historic District, Rochester, New York
South Water Street Historic District, Martinsburg, West Virginia
Water Street Commercial Buildings, a National Register of Historic Places listing in Sandusky, Ohio